Scott Patrick Sheldon (born November 20, 1968) is an American former professional baseball third baseman/shortstop and right-handed batter who played for the Oakland Athletics and Texas Rangers of Major League Baseball (MLB). He also played for the Orix BlueWave of Nippon Professional Baseball (NPB).

On September 6, 2000, while playing for the Rangers, Sheldon became the third player in MLB history to play all nine positions in a single game, joining Bert Campaneris (Kansas City Athletics, September 8), and César Tovar (Minnesota Twins, September 22). Sheldon entered the game in the 4th inning and performed the feat in just five frames. He was later joined by Shane Halter (Detroit Tigers, October 1), and Andrew Romine (Detroit Tigers, September 30) in the select list of players to play all nine positions in the same game. 

In his 141-game MLB career Sheldon batted .235, with 8 home runs and 33 runs batted in.

He spent two years in NPB with the BlueWave, batting. 255 with 34 homers and 83 RBI.

References

External links

1968 births
Living people
American expatriate baseball players in Canada
American expatriate baseball players in Japan
Altoona Curve players
Baseball players from Indiana
Clear Lake High School (Houston, Texas) alumni
Edmonton Trappers players
Houston Cougars baseball players
Huntsville Stars players
Indianapolis Indians players
Madison Muskies players
Major League Baseball infielders
Major League Baseball outfielders
Nashville Sounds players
Nippon Professional Baseball first basemen
Nippon Professional Baseball third basemen
Oakland Athletics players
Oklahoma RedHawks players
Orix BlueWave players
Southern Oregon A's players
Sportspeople from Hammond, Indiana
Texas Rangers players